Ascoli Piceno Cathedral is a Roman Catholic cathedral dedicated to Saint Emygdius in Ascoli Piceno, Marche, Italy. It is the episcopal seat of the Diocese of Ascoli Piceno.

See also 
Catholic Church in Italy

References 

Roman Catholic cathedrals in Italy
Cathedrals in the Marche
Roman Catholic churches in Ascoli Piceno
Minor basilicas in Marche